Ernest Owens (born October 3, 1982) better known as Applejaxx, is a Christian hip hop artist from North Carolina.

Background
His early influences ranged from Run DMC, N.W.A, and Nas. He grew up playing basketball and had always enjoyed hip hop. In 1997, Applejaxx started to write rhymes and freestyle. Soon after high school, Applejaxx went on to attend Campbell University in North Carolina, where he soon met Tonéx at a concert in 2003. Owens was interviewed by the prolific rapper Eminem's station Shade 45. The name Applejaxx refers to bearing good fruit as Apple, "jaxx" comes in as "jacking" someone out of the world into the light, out to bear good fruit. His first appearance was on gospel/pop artist Tonéx's album Out The Box. The single off his first project, "Nureau Anthem", which features T.Bizzy, was featured on HipHopDX.com. He has also collaborated with many in the Christian hip hop community, making guest appearances with artists such as DJ Morph, Gibraan, and The Washington Projects.

Album Title Issue
Applejaxx was set to release his debut album "Born Identity" out with Universal, but due to the Bourne Identity movies by the company and Universal being concerned about consumer confusion, they told him to change the title.  He then decided on "Back 2 The Future" instead.

Miscellaneous
Applejaxx is also a staff assistant at Harvard Law in Technology & Research.

Discography

Albums
Back 2 The Future (2009)
Organic (2012)

EPs
805 P.O.P. (2005)
Jesus High (2010)
Jesus High (Deluxe) (2011)
Appletizer (2012)

Music Videos
 2009 - Green As Luigi
 2010 - Future

References

1982 births
Living people
American hip hop musicians
American performers of Christian music
Musicians from Fayetteville, North Carolina